Gelbelsee is a north Bavarian village described in historical texts dating from the 13th century.

History
Gelbelsee lies in a forested, age-old settlement area, like the hill graves from the Hallstatt time (1200 to 500 CE). The Hallstein people belonged historically to the Illyrischen people. Germanic people followed them during the migration in the 5th century the Bajuwaren. 

Coming from the east, a pre-Roman road continues by Gelbelsee and Kristal and Kipfenberg to the west. One road ran past the Roman lines. Two observation towers, a barracks and well survive. In the oldest documents, the village is known as Gouliubese, "lake of the Gouliub". In 1301 the name Gelbelsee was written.

Gelbelsee transmitter
Gelbelsee transmitter, which belongs to the Bavarian Broadcasting Company, is used for transmitting FM in north Upper Bavaria, Ingolstadt and Eichstätt. It went into service in 1952 as a relay transmitter for Altmühl valley.

References

External links

Google translation of www.gelbelsee.com

Villages in Bavaria